The Substitute: Failure Is Not An Option (also known as The Substitute 4) is a 2001 action thriller film directed by Robert Radler and starring Treat Williams as Karl Thomasson, a former mercenary who must infiltrate a military school's faculty to stop the actions of a white supremacist cult. The film is the fourth and final installment in The Substitute series and was released direct-to-video.

Plot 
Karl Thomasson, an ex-Special Forces soldier and retired mercenary, is approached by his old army buddy Teague who gives him a mission: working undercover at a military school where Ted, Teague's nephew, is one of the cadets. Teague believes that the cadets and the student faculty are part of a group of white supremacist neo nazis called the Werewolf Unit. Officially, the werewolves are a special unit being run at the school. Karl accepts the mission and begins working as a history teacher at the school, seeking to expose and eradicate the unit.

While investigating, Karl teams up with Devlin, a martial arts teacher at the school who served with Karl in the U.S. Army. They learn that Colonel J.C. Brack is leader of the unit and Ted is one of the cult members.

Cast 
 Treat Williams as Karl Thomasson, former U.S. Special Forces soldier and mercenary. Thomasson states in this film that he earned his Doctorate in contemporary literature. 
 Angie Everhart as Dr. Jenny Chamberlain, an attractive doctor at the academy and Karl's love interest.
 Patrick Kilpatrick as Colonel J.C. Brack, the military academy's Commanding officer and founder of the Werewolf Unit.
 Bill Nunn as Luther, an ex-soldier who works as a janitor at the military academy.
 Tim Abell as Devlin, an ex-soldier who works as a martial arts teacher at the academy.
 Grayson Fricke as Ted Teague, cadet and Werewolf Unit member who later regrets joining it.
 Simon Rhee as Lim, Korean mercenary who is a Drill Instructor of the Werewolf Unit.
 David Leitch as Van, mercenary who is a Drill Instructor of the Werewolf Unit.
 Scott Miles as Buckner, racist cadet and the cadet commander of the academy and of the Werewolf Unit.
 Brian Beegle as Frey, Ted's best friend and Werewolf Unit member.
 Samantha Thomas as Harmon, bossy female cadet and Werewolf Unit member.
 Jonathan Michael Weatherly as Malik, a cadet at the academy.
 Lori Beth Edgeman as Cunningham, female cadet who is picked on by Harmon.
 Moe Michaels as Robson, a cadet at the academy.
 J. Don Ferguson as General Robert Teague, Karl's old war buddy and Ted's uncle.
 K.C. Powe as Sissy Brack, waitress at a bar and Brack's daughter.
 Lonnie R. Smith Jr. as Yulee, mercenary and Thomasson's friend.
 Laura-Shay Griffin as Dixie, waitress at the local bar.

Reception 
Robert Pardi of TV Guide rated it 2/4 stars and wrote that the film, though preposterous, is tolerable if one lowers their expectations.  Aaron Beirle of DVD Talk rated it 0.5/5 stars and wrote, "Even for the low-budget action (or, as I call it 'cable action') genre, Substitute 4 remains a pretty dull actioner."

References

External links 
 

2001 films
2001 action thriller films
2000s crime action films
American action thriller films
American crime action films
American crime thriller films
American sequel films
Films about educators
Films about school violence
Direct-to-video sequel films
Artisan Entertainment films
The Substitute films
Films directed by Robert Radler
2000s English-language films
2000s American films